The 1900–01 FA Cup was the 30th season of the world's oldest association football competition, the Football Association Challenge Cup (more usually known as the FA Cup). The cup was won by Tottenham Hotspur of the Southern League, who defeated Sheffield United 3–1 in a replay after a 2–2 draw in the first game. This was the only occasion since the formation of The Football League in 1888 that a club from outside the League won the cup.

Matches were scheduled to be played at the stadium of the team named first on the date specified for each round, which was always a Saturday. If scores were level after 90 minutes had been played, a replay would take place at the stadium of the second-named team later the same week. If the replayed match was drawn further replays would be held at neutral venues until a winner was determined. If scores were level after 90 minutes had been played in a replay, a 30-minute period of extra time would be played.

Calendar
The format of the FA Cup for the season had a preliminary round, five qualifying rounds, an intermediate round, three proper rounds, and the semi finals and final.

Intermediate round

The Intermediate Round featured ten games, played between the ten winners of the fifth qualifying round, and ten teams given byes. Football League First Division Liverpool and Stoke, along with Burslem Port Vale, Glossop, Grimsby Town, Newton Heath, New Brighton Tower and Woolwich Arsenal from the Football League Second Division were entered automatically into this round, as were Southern League Division One Portsmouth and Bristol City.

The other Second Division sides had to gain entry to this round through the earlier qualifying rounds. Barnsley, Blackpool, Burton Swifts, Chesterfield, Gainsborough Trinity, Lincoln City, Middlesbrough, Stockport County and Walsall were all entered in the third qualifying round. Of these, only Chesterfield, Middlesbrough and Walsall reached the Intermediate Round. They were joined by seven other non-league sides.

The ten matches were played on 5 January 1901. One tie, which was Reading v Bristol City, went to a replay, played in the following midweek. This rematch again resulted in a draw, so a second replay was played the following week at a neutral venue (Swindon Town's County Ground).

First round proper
The first round proper contained sixteen ties between 32 teams. The remaining 16 of the 18 Football League First Division sides were given a bye to this round, as were Small Heath, Burnley and Leicester Fosse from the Football League Second Division, and Southern League Division One Southampton, Millwall Athletic and Tottenham Hotspur. They joined the ten teams who won in the intermediate round.

The matches were played on Saturday 9 February 1901. Four matches were drawn, with the replays taking place in the following midweek.

Second round proper
The eight Second Round matches were scheduled for Saturday 23 February 1901. There was one replay, between Aston Villa and Nottingham Forest, played in the following midweek.

Third round proper
The four Third Round matches were scheduled for Saturday, 23 March 1901. Two replays were needed, played in the following midweek.

Semi-finals

The semi-final matches were both intended to be played on Saturday 6 April 1901. Sheffield United and Aston Villa played on this date, but drew their tie and had to replay it five days later; this next match finished in a 3–0 win for United. The other game, Tottenham Hotspur against West Bromwich Albion, was delayed until Monday 8 April and finished in a convincing win for Spurs.

Replay

Final

The final took place on Saturday 20 April 1901 at Crystal Palace.  Over 110,000 supporters attended the match. Fred Priest opened the scoring for Sheffield United after about 20 minutes. Sandy Brown headed an equalising goal shortly afterwards and half time arrived with the score 1–1. Brown put Spurs ahead early in the second half, but, not to be denied, Sheffield United pressed strongly, and Walter Bennett headed an equaliser for the draw.

In the replay, Spurs became the first and only "non (Football) league" side to win the FA Cup since the creation of Football League when they beat United 3–1 before an attendance of 20,470 at Burnden Park, Bolton. John Cameron opened the scoring before centre forward Sandy Brown became the first player to score in every round. He netted both goals in the final as well as one in the replay for a total of 15 in the season's competition.

Match details

Replay

See also
FA Cup Final Results 1872-

References
General
Official site; fixtures and results service at TheFA.com
1900-01 FA Cup at rsssf.com
1900-01 FA Cup at soccerbase.com
Specific

 
1900-01